Dennis Trammel Brown (born November 6, 1967) is a former defensive end who played seven seasons for the San Francisco 49ers in the National Football League.

Career history 
Dennis Brown played football at Long Beach Jordan High School and his strong performance earned him offers to attend various top-notch colleges, including UCLA and USC.  He attended the University of Washington from 1986-1990 where he wore #79 and was drafted by the San Francisco 49ers in the 1990 NFL Draft. That same year he earned the team's Rookie of the Year honors. In 1995, he started in Super Bowl XXIX. After retirement he moved to Seattle, Washington, with his wife Danielle, daughter Darienne Kathleen, and his son Derrick Jonathan. In 1998, Danielle and Dennis divorced. Dennis has received the San Francisco 49ers Community Relations Alumni Service Award nine times since his NFL retirement. He also serves as an ambassador for USA Heads Up Football and as an alumni representative for the San Francisco 49ers. He served four years on the board of the San Mateo ( PAL) Police Athletic League, currently sits on the board of the San Francisco police activities league, also serves on the Players Advisory Board of the NFL Alumni Northern California, Today Dennis is a Sports Analyst for Comcast Sports Net, and host of the KNBR 49ers pre/post game shows. He lives in San Francisco with his wife, Erica.

Quotes 
"I think to myself, do you know how many guys play their whole careers and never get the chance to be a champion? Yet, I was lucky enough to experience it. 
Sometimes I stop and think, man that was big deal, a Super Bowl! And I had the opportunity to be a part of it!"

"It was so quiet on the bus. Everybody was just thinking about what they had accomplished. I was in a two-year stretch where things weren’t going very well for me-- my marriage was about over, I had some health problems, things like that. But this game was an escape, a chance to get away from everything for a while... So we’re on the bus, and Rickey Jackson’s son fell asleep on me... I was quietly looking out the window at all the buildings going by, and I thought, Wow, I just won a Super Bowl -- and here I've got this kid asleep on my leg"

See also
 Washington Huskies football statistical leaders

References

External links 
 https://web.archive.org/web/20110716021448/http://washington.scout.com/2/230090.html
 http://www.viewimages.com/Search.aspx?mid=258084&epmid=2&partner=Google
 https://web.archive.org/web/20070817051640/http://www.sf49ers.com/history/awards.php?section=HI%20Awards
 https://web.archive.org/web/20080727013809/http://www.sf49ers.com/history/images/niners_alltime_starters.pdf
 https://web.archive.org/web/20121103040131/http://www.databasefootball.com/players/playerpage.htm?ilkid=BROWNDEN01

1967 births
Living people
Players of American football from Los Angeles
American football defensive linemen
Washington Huskies football players
San Francisco 49ers players
Players of American football from Long Beach, California
Ed Block Courage Award recipients